Vukovar, jedna priča (English: Vukovar: A Story) is a Serbian war film directed by Boro Drašković. It was released in 1994. It is also known as Vukovar poste restante. The film was selected as the Serbian entry for the Best Foreign Language Film at the 67th Academy Awards, but was not accepted as a nominee. The film's slogan was Nothing is stronger than love, maybe only war!

Plot
The film takes place in Vukovar, a city on the border between Serbia and Croatia, in a country which used to be called SFR Yugoslavia, on the eve of the country's breakup. It is a typical love story, between a Croat woman Ana (Mirjana Joković) and a Serb man Toma (Boris Isaković), who marry one another with the blessing of both families right before the Battle of Vukovar. Their harmonic community is brutally broken apart with the start of a civil war. Not only they but everyone around them, against their will, are brought into the craziness of war which divides them from family and friends. Divided, living through hell, they still hope that the horrors of war will stop and that their newborn baby will be able to have a fresh start.

Cast
 Mirjana Joković as Ana
 Boris Isaković as Toma
 Svetlana Bojković as Vilma 
 Predrag Ejdus as Stjepan
 Mihailo Janketić as Dusan
 Dušica Žegarac as Vera
 Monika Romić as Ratka
 Goran Drozdek as Domagoj
 Nebojša Glogovac as Fadil
 Mira Banjac as Milka

Production
The film was shot in late 1993 in war-ruined Vukovar, only ten kilometres from the front lines. Battle scenes were filmed in silence as to not perturb or frighten the city's few remaining civilians.

Reception

Croatia
In December 1995, the Croatian delegation prevented the film from being screened at a United Nations conference, calling it "propaganda".  Writing for the Croatian daily Jutarnji list, Jurica Pavičić gave it a scathing review, saying the film was consistently promoting a false equidistance between the Croatian and Serbian nationalisms in the war, which he personally found particularly irritating after the Vukovar massacre and at the height of the siege of Sarajevo. In 2009, the Zagreb Film Festival director wanted to include the film in its "Film and propaganda" session, but the film's producer retracted their permission for the showing.

International
In reviewing the film for Variety, critic Allen Young compared the Serbian-Croatian couple to the story of Romeo and Juliet and wrote that the film's "depiction of a beautiful country’s loss of its moral compass is a terrifying, dazzling achievement". In his review for The New York Times, Stephen Holden echoed the Shakespearean comparison while noting the film's "disturbing" portrayal of war and highlighting its anti-war premise. Writing for New York, Maureen Callahan stated that, although the film "isn't as technically accomplished or as seamlessly scripted as, say, Schindler's List, it is just as important and even more remarkable for its virtually real-time immediacy". Film historian Andrew Horton writes that the film's value is "equally powerful for not degenerating into a simplistic 'us against them' polemic film" but instead leaving the audience with "a troubling feeling of 'look what we have done to ourselves'".

Awards
Won
Mediterranean Film Prize for Peace and Tolerance at the Jerusalem Film Festival (1995)

See also
 List of submissions to the 67th Academy Awards for Best Foreign Language Film
 List of Serbian submissions for the Academy Award for Best Foreign Language Film

References

Sources

External links
 

1994 films
1990s war drama films
Anti-war films
War films based on actual events
Yugoslav Wars films
Vukovar
Works about the Croatian War of Independence
Serbian war drama films
Yugoslav war drama films
1994 drama films